Plectrohyla glandulosa is a species of frog in the family Hylidae.
It is found in Guatemala and possibly Mexico.
Its natural habitats are subtropical or tropical moist montane forests, subtropical or tropical high-altitude grassland, and rivers.
It is threatened by habitat loss.

References

G
Frogs of North America
Amphibians of Mexico
Amphibians of Guatemala
Endangered fauna of North America
Amphibians described in 1883
Taxonomy articles created by Polbot